The Pakistani province of Khyber Pakhtunkhwa has been known by a number of names throughout its history. In addition to North-West Frontier Province, the official name by which it was known from 1901 to 2010, other names used or proposed for the province include Gandhara, Pakhtunistan, Pashtunistan, Pathanistan, Sarhad, Abasin, Khyber, or a combination of these and other names.

North-West Frontier Province

For over a hundred years after its founding as a province of British Raj in 1901, it was known as the North-West Frontier Province ( Śhumāl maġribī sarhadī sūbha). Unofficially, it was known as Sarhad, derived from the province's Urdu name, which means "frontier".

Pakhtunkhwa

Pakhtunkhwa, Pakhtoonkhwa, Pukhtunkhwa or Pashtunkhwa has often been the name used by the Pashtun people for the Pashtunized and Pashtun-dominated areas of Pakistan. More recently it was used by Pashtun nationalists in Pakistan as the name by which they wanted to rename the former North-West Frontier Province (NWFP), where they are the ethnic majority.

Pakhtunkhwa (and the other transliteration variants) is derived from Pakhtun and khwa, the former refers to the ethnic group and the latter literally means "heart". Metaphorically, it is used to indicate "near the Pakhtuns (Pashtuns)". Nationalist Pashtuns claim Pakhtunkhwa is an old name of the area inhabited by Pashtuns. But in fact Pashtun leader Khan Abdul Ghaffar Khan (Bacha Khan) proposed this name as alternative to Pakhtunistan to military dictator Muhammad Zia-ul-Haq in 1978, when the latter refused to accept the demand from the former to rename the NWFP as Pashtunistan. The famous Greek historian Herodotus had recorded it as Paktia, but Pashtun poets from the time of Shahabuddin Muhammad Ghori down to the present age, have been mentioning it as Pakhtunkhwa.

The earliest available historical evidence is Akhund Darweza's (died 1638) Makhzanul Islam (written between 1603 and 1612). A verse in this book reads: "Pakhtunkhwa pa misal shpa wa, dai deewa wo pa andher ke." (Translation: Pakhtunkhwa was like a night and he [Pir Baba Syed Ali Termezi] was like a candle).

Similarly, the often-quoted two lines of a poem by Ahmad Shah Abdali (1723–1773), the Founding Father of Afghan state, mention Pakhtunkhwa as the land of the Pashtuns:

Translation: I forget my Delhi throne when I recall the mountain peaks of my own Pakhtunkhwa.

After him, Pashtun poets and writers have frequently used this name for the area which was later named as North-West Frontier Province by the British after they occupied and separated it from today's Afghanistan dividing the Pashtuns into four divisions. The word Pakhtunkhwa was also used in the modern poetry by contemporary poets like Qalandar Momand (1930–2003) long before it was suggested as the nomenclature for the NWFP.

Dr. A. H. Dani, a well known historian and archaeologist, presently the Director of the Islamabad-based Center for the Study of the Civilizations of Central Asia, told Dawn that Pakhtunistan is a political name but Pakhtunkhwa is not. "Culturally there is no doubt that the land was called Pakhtunkhwa in Pashto literature since the 15th century (we have a trace of literature since that time only). The term has been applied for both tribal and settled areas, he added.

Besides Pashtus, there are many non-Pashtuns who have mentioned this name in their writings. A book by French orientalist James Darmesteter has the title, Da Pakhtunkhwa Bagh w Bahar, a selection of Pashto poems with a valuable essay on Pashto language.

Afghania

Afghania is another name long considered as a replacement for North-West Frontier Province. It was proposed first by the founding leaders of the Muslim League in 1933 and was at least partly chosen to represent the first "a" in "Pakistan". The need for a change was explained by the man who named Pakistan in his "Now or Never" pamphlet, Choudhary Rahmat Ali Khan, as:

Other names
Other names used or proposed for the province include: 
 Pashtunistan: also used for all lands inhabited by Pashtuns,
 Abasin: from the Pashto name for the Indus River,
 Khyber: from the Khyber Pass,
 Nuristan: also the name of a province of Afghanistan), 
 Gandhara ( Gandḥārā): from the historical kingdom of Gandhara in the region, or
 a combination of these names, or
 others such as Pakhtoonkhwa-Hazara or Hazara-Pakhtunkhwa (in reference to the Hazara region where Hindko-speakers are dominant as compared to the Pashto-speakers elsewhere in the province).

Many of these alternatives were designed to avoid or balance the ethnic connotations of Pakhtunkhwa.

Efforts to change the name

For most of the history of the North-West Frontier Province (NWFP), there were efforts to change its name. As early as 1933, when Afghania was proposed, suggestions for new names came and went. Although some of the names were ethnically neutral, most proposals emphazised the province's Pashtun ethnic identity. The renaming issue was an emotional one which often crossed party lines and not all supporters of a renaming agreed on the name Pakhtunkhwa (some preferred Pashtunistan/Pakhtunistan).

20th-century efforts
By the late 20th century, President Muhammad Zia-ul-Haq agreed with Khan Abdul Ghaffar Khan to change the name but he contended that the term Pashtunistan had become controversial and was being politicized by Afghanistan. Ghaffar Khan suggested Pakhtunkhwa, but Zia-ul-Haq asked Ghaffar Khan to suggest an alternative.

The name Pakhtunkhwa for NWFP was heard for the first time in 1988 in the Provincial Assembly when the Pakistan Peoples Party (PPP) leadership wanted to move a resolution for changing the name. At that time, neither the Pashtun nationalist Awami National Party (ANP) nor any other party pressed any further for the adoption of the resolution as the then speaker of the Provincial Assembly, Masoud Kausar, ruled that the MPAs were free to call their province whatever name they liked.

The name was first used in the National Assembly in November 1990, when Muhammad Afzal Khan of Pakistan Democratic Alliance referred to the province as Pakhtunkhwa.

The name Pakhtunkhwa is very popular with the ordinary Pashtun people and was approved by the democratically elected constitutional assembly of the province, in 1997, by a 53 to 2 (45 abstentions) majority vote. Some 53 percent of the total lawmakers of the NWFP Assembly voted in favour of the Pakhtunkhwa name when a resolution was moved and passed by the provincial assembly in November 1997, it was tabled by Aftab Ahmad Khan Sherpao and supported by the ANP, Jamiat Ulema-e-Islam (F), Independent MPAs, and Jamiat-e-Islami. It was opposed by two MPAs, Salim Saifullah and Humayun Saifullah, both Pashtuns of the Pakistan Muslim League (J) faction, while the Pakistan Muslim League (N) with 37 members abstained.

However, the PML (N) parliamentary party of NWFP rejected the ANP demand but called for Prime Minister Nawaz Sharif to suggest another "non-controversial" name. PML (N) members noted that Sarhad was a good name for the province but, if a change was needed, then it should be named Khyber or Abasin. The NWFP chief minister, Sardar Mehtab Ahmed Khan, called for a referendum on the issue as a way of determining the name. These offers were rejected by the ANP leadership and the ANP withdrew from both the federal and provincial governments

21st-century efforts
The lack of support for a name change by the PML (N) was defended as opposition to the nationalistic politics being pursued by the ANP.

In May 2008, to accommodate a demand by the people of NWFP who voted for the ANP, the PPP proposed that the name of the North-West Frontier Province be changed to Pakhtunkhwa, however the Muslim League Nawaz which had considerable support in the Hindko-speaking Hazara region of the province announced it might oppose the name change because of it "being on ethnic grounds" because of opposition by its provincial leadership, yet the party fails to explain the fact that the names of the other three provinces (Punjab, Sindh and Baluchistan) represent the ethnic identity of their majority populace, despite how they camouflage that fact with their version of the history of those provinces.

The name Pakhtunkhwa was mentioned for the first time in the United Nation's General Assembly by Pakistani President Asif Zardari on 26 September 2008.

Renaming and the renaming controversy

In early 2010, the process of renaming proceeded and the Pakistani Senate confirmed the name change to Khyber Pakhtunkhwa in the 18th amendment to the Constitution of Pakistan with a unanimous 90 votes on 15 April 2010. Some Hazara residents said that the new name should be Hazara-Pakhtunkhwa, and others said the name should not be changed since the people were accustomed to North-West Frontier Province.

Arif Nizami, former editor of The Nation, said, "This has actually opened a Pandora's box, because of Pakistan's very tenuous polity. Now, on one side, there are identity issues and ethnic issues and provincial autonomy issues. The other side is religious issues and terrorism. It's a very explosive situation."

See also
 Pashto
 Pashtun people
 Pashtun diaspora
 Pashtun culture
 Pashtunistan

Notes

References

External links
 Pashtunkhwa: A Development Framework 

History of Khyber Pakhtunkhwa
Political history of Pakistan
Geographic history of Pakistan
Khyber Pakhtunkhwa
Provincial disputes in Pakistan
 
Khyber Pakhtunkhwa
Khyber Pakhtunkhwa
Pashto words and phrases